Joseph Broadhurst (1862 – after 1888) was an English footballer who played for Stoke.

Career
Broadhurst was born in Stoke-upon-Trent and played football with Leek before joining Stoke in 1887. He played once in FA Cup in the 1887–88 season which came in a 4–1 defeat to West Bromwich Albion. He left Stoke at the end of the season returned to Leek.

Career statistics

References

1862 births
Year of death missing
Footballers from Stoke-on-Trent
English footballers
Leek F.C. players
Stoke City F.C. players
Association football midfielders